Nord Island is a small rocky island which is the northernmost feature in the Curzon Islands. It was charted in 1951 by the French Antarctic Expedition and named for its position in the island group, nord being French for north.

See also 
 List of Antarctic and sub-Antarctic islands

Islands of Adélie Land